The Czech Republic national rugby union team is the third tier rugby national team of the Czech Republic.

They first started playing as the Czech Republic in 1993 after the split of Czechoslovakia and now compete in the European Nations Cup. They have yet to qualify for the Rugby World Cup, but have entered the qualifiers since the 1995 edition. Rugby union in the Czech Republic is administered by the Czech Rugby Union. The sport is still amateur in the country, but there are several Czech players who are professionals in France, including Martin Jágr.

The best ranking in the world ranking was 24th place in 2005.
The national side is ranked 36th in the world (as of 5 November 2019).

History
In 2005, they took on Australian Super Rugby side the Waratahs in Prague, losing 3–94.

The nation played against Hong Kong at the Synot Tip Arena in Prague on 16 December 2009. They won 17–5. It was the final match for six players: Antonín Brabec, Jan Macháček, Jan Oswald, Pavel Syrový, Ladislav Vondrášek and Jan Žíla.

The Czech Republic were relegated from the European Nations Cup First Division to the Second Division in 2014, after finishing 6th in their group.

On 9 November 2016 The Czech Republic played in a historical match against the Barbarians to celebrate the Czech Rugby Union's 90th anniversary. The match was held at the Marketa Stadium in Prague. They lost the match to the Barbarians, 71–0.

Record

World Cup

European Competitions Since 2000

Overall

Recent Matches
Matches played in the last 12 months

Current squad

The following players were selected for the 2021-2022 Rugby Europe Conference 1 North match against  Luxembourg on 27th November 2021.

Head Coach:  Miroslav Němeček

Caps Updated: 

|}

Coaches

Notable former players

See also
 Rugby union in the Czech Republic
 Czech Rugby Union

References

External links

 Czech Rugby Union - Official site 
 Current Squad

 
Rugby union in the Czech Republic
European national rugby union teams
Teams in European Nations Cup (rugby union)